Shadrack Ngema (10 October 1950 – 5 December 2015) was a South African actor and sports commentator. He is best known for playing the character Magubane on Emzini Wezinsizwa. He starred alongside Jerry Phele, Roland Mqwebu, Vusi Thanda and Jabulani Nkosi. The sitcom aired until 2004, on SABC 1.

Ngema was born in KwaZulu-Natal, South Africa in a traditional Zulu background. He was a sport commentator on Ukhozi FM.

Death
He died of a heart condition on 5 December 2015.

References

1950 births
2015 deaths
South African male television actors
People from KwaZulu-Natal
Sports commentators